Cwm Clydach (Cwm is Welsh for "valley" and Clydach is a popular river name) may refer to:

Places
 Cwm Clydach, Kidwelly, a site of special scientific interest (SSSI) near Kidwelly, Carmarthenshire
 Cwm Clydach National Nature Reserve, on the Clydach Gorge in Blaenau Gwent
 Cwm Clydach RSPB Reserve, near the village of Clydach, Swansea
 Cwm Clydach, Rhondda Cynon Taf, a community and electoral ward in Rhondda Cynon Taf based around the village of Clydach Vale
 Cwm Clydach, the Welsh language name for Clydach Vale, a village in Rhondda Cynon Taf
 Clydach Gorge (Blaenau Gwent), also known as Cwm Clydach

See also
 Clydach (disambiguation), in particular for rivers with that name